Gazole may refer to:
 Gazole (community development block), Malda district, West Bengal
 Gazole Town, census town of Malda district
 Gazole (Vidhan Sabha constituency), West Bengal
 Gazole Mahavidyalaya, a general degree college under University of Gour Banga
 Gazole railway station (GZO), railway station in Malda, West Bengal